A noisemaker is something intended to make a loud noise, usually for fun. Instruments or devices commonly considered "noisemakers" include:
 pea whistles
 air horns, composed of a pressurized air source coupled to a horn, designed to create an extremely loud noise
 fireworks, such as firecrackers, bottle rockets, bang snaps and others
 party horns, paper tubes often flattened and rolled into a coil, which unrolls when blown into, producing a horn-like noise
 ratchets, orchestral musical instruments played by percussionists. See also derkach and rapach.
 sirens
 vuvuzelas, plastic horns that produce a loud monotone note
 the head joint of recorders
 couesnophones
 Groan Tubes
 moo boxes
 whirly tubes
 firecrackers
Noisemakers are popular with children as toy musical instruments. They can be perfectly included in loud rhythm bands and in the music education for young children.

External links
 

Party equipment